Real Friends may refer to:

Real Friends (band), an American band
Real Friends (The Friends of Distinction album), a 1970 album by The Friends of Distinction
Real Friends (Chris Janson album), a 2019 album by Chris Janson
"Real Friends" (Kanye West song), a 2016 song by Kanye West
"Real Friends" (Camila Cabello song), 2017